was a painting school in Stockholm, Sweden, which was offered by  ('the Artists' Society') 1890–1908. The latter association was in turn established in opposition to the Royal Swedish Academy of Fine Arts. One of the school's co-founders was Richard Bergh. The school had several well-known teachers, including Anders Zorn, Nils Kreuger and Karl Nordström, in addition to Bergh himself. Several of the alumni would distinguish themselves on the contemporary Swedish visual arts scene. The group , for example, consisted mainly of pupils from the school.

First school 1890–1896 
In 1886,  was formed due to dissatisfaction with the Royal Swedish Academy of Fine Arts. With this came a desire for an independent art school. In Denmark there were already two art schools outside the Academy, Krøyer's and Zahrtmann's schools.  therefore decided to start teaching and Richard Bergh would be the one to lead it. The school distinguished itself by letting the pupils take the initiative and teaching was done through a continuous discussion of their work. Pupils who felt they could afford it had to contribute to the cost of rent and heating.

The first school in 1890–1896 was run by Bergh. Patrons such as Eva Bonnier, Prince Eugen, Pontus Fürstenberg and Ernest Thiel sponsored the school. A quarter of the pupils, ten in number, were women.

Teachers 

 Richard Bergh
 Anders Zorn
 Per Hasselberg

Selected students

Second school 1899–1901 
The school was run by Bergh and sponsored by Zorn, Fürstenberg and Messrs Lamm.

Selected students

Third school 1905–1908 
The school was run by Bergh. Robert Thegerström made himself unpopular and was forced to resign as a teacher. This is often regarded as the breakthrough of modernism in Swedish art. The last school had 31 men and nine women.

Teachers

Students 

 was enrolled but fell ill a few days before the start of school.

References

Signums Svenska Konsthistoria, Bokförlaget Signum, 
Sandström, Sven, Konsten i Sverige, Nordstedt, 

Modernism
Art schools in Sweden
Painting